Lassalle is a surname, originally a Gasconic patronymic. People with the name include:

 Camille-Léopold Cabaillot-Lassalle (1839-1902), French painter
 Ferdinand Lassalle (1825–64), German socialist
 Gilbert Duclos-Lassalle (born 1954), French cyclist
 Hugo Enomiya-Lassalle (1898–1990), Jesuit priest and Zen Buddhist
 Jean Lassalle (1847–1909), French operatic baritone
 Jean Lassalle (born 1955), French politician
 Rex Lassalle (born 1945), Trinidad-Tobago lieutenant and mutineer
 Robert Lassalle (1882–1940), French politician